Venerable Nicola D'Onofrio (March 24, 1943 - June 12, 1964) was a Catholic seminiarian and member of the Camillian order from Abruzzo, Italy who was declared Venerable by Pope Francis in 2013.

Early life
Nicola D'Onofrio was born in Villamagna, Italy to Giovanni and Virginia Ferrara D'Onofrio. His interest in the Camillians began when he was a child because of his fascination with the large red cross on their religious habit. When he was ten years old a Camillian priest invited him to join the Camillian students in Rome, however his parents felt he was unready. After studying for one year, his parents gave him permission to join the Camillian school. He entered the school on the feast day of Saint Thérèse of Lisieux.

Religious Life
D'Onofrio was known for his humble and friendly character and smiling disposition. He was a diligent student and gained the admiration of his teachers. In 1961, he took his simple religious vows. He developed a devotion to Saint Thérèse of Lisieux and received the Eucharist daily. He studied in depth the works of Saint Camillus de Lellis, the founder of his order and dedicated the majority of his time to the needs of his religious community.

Illness and Death
Nicola began to feel the first symptoms of illness in 1962 but didn't receive a diagnosis until six months later. On July 30, 1963 he was operated on and diagnosed with teratosarcoma which had begun to metastasize. In January 1964, an X-Ray revealed his cancer had spread to his lungs. D'Onofrio was sent as a pilgrim to Lourdes and Lisieux. A Camillian religious when saying goodbye said "Over the next few days all of us will pray for you" to which Nicola replied "Yes, pray, pray… not for my healing, but that I may do the will of God".

A request was sent to Pope Paul VI to allow him to take his perpetual vows. He was granted permission and took his vows on May 28, 1964. On June 5, he was given the Sacrament of the Sick. On June 12, his family and close friends surrounded him. He spent the entire day in prayer and died at 9:15pm. He was 21.

Cause for Sainthood
In June 2000, the cause for beatification was opened and on July 5, 2013, Pope Francis declared him Venerable.

References

1943 births
1964 deaths
Camillians
People from Chieti
Venerated Catholics by Pope Francis
20th-century Roman Catholics